Maârif or El Maârif is a neighborhood of Casablanca, in the Anfa district of the Casablanca-Settat region of Morocco. As of 2004 it had 180,394 inhabitants.

History 
In 1949, the Algerian musician Salim Halali settled in Morocco and transformed an old café in Maârif into a prestigious cabaret, where Warda Al-Jazairia and El-Haja El-Hamdaouia performed. In the neighborhood is also located the Mohammed V stadium which holds room for 44'000 spectators.

The novelist Mohamed Zafzaf also lived in the neighborhood.

References

Arrondissements of Casablanca
Neighbourhoods of Casablanca
Morocco geography articles needing translation from French Wikipedia